Elisha King (born 15 June 1999) is an Australian rules footballer who played for the North Melbourne Football Club in the AFL Women's competition (AFLW). King was signed by North Melbourne as a free agent during the expansion club signing period in 2018.

Prior to being signed by North Melbourne, King had trained with 's squad and had been named Under 18 All-Australian at age 16 for her performances at the 2015 AFL Women's Under 18 Championships. It was revealed she signed on with the club for one more season on 17 June 2021, tying her to the club until the end of 2022.

In June 2022, King was delisted by North Melbourne.

References

External links 

1999 births
Living people
North Melbourne Football Club (AFLW) players
Australian rules footballers from Queensland